Kwakéa (or Pakea, or Qakea ) is an islet located east of Vanua Lava in the Banks Islands, Vanuatu. According to the 2009 census, it has a population of only 29.

Geography
The island of Kwakéa has a monsoon climate. The average temperature is 22 °C. The warmest month is March (23 °C), and the coldest month is September (22 °C). The average annual rainfall is 3337 millimeters.

The channel that flows between Kwakea and Vanua Lava is known as Dudley Channel. Islet Nawila lies 500 m west of Kwakéa.

Name
The spellings Kwakéa (or Kwakea) and Pakea represent two different attempts at transcribing the form , which is the island's name in the Mota language. This form is rendered as Qakea in Mota's orthography.

The same island is known under slightly different names in the vernacular languages of the region: Qakē in Vurës; Qeke in Mwesen; Aqke in Mwotlap.

All of these names can be derived from a form *ᵐBwaᵑgea in Proto-Torres-Banks.

History
The islet was once settled by migrants from nearby Mota. 

In addition, the anthropologist Robert Codrington spoke of an earlier migration of Polynesians from Tonga sometime during the first half of the 19th century, around 50 years before he wrote his work on Melanesian languages in 1885. However, they were forced to leave after a series of quarrels with the native Melanesians and when they tried to return a year later, they were attacked and were driven off.

In the mid-1890s, English settlers Frank and Alice Whitford purchased the island from the native title owners, who were from Mota. The Whitfords created palm plantations, but a hurricane on November 25, 1939, wiped out the island, and nothing was ever redeveloped. The only thing that remains is the Whitford family cemetery.

References

External links
University of Canterbury Library
Whitford stories
Experiencing new worlds

Islands of Vanuatu
Torba Province